Strange Weather is the fourth solo studio album by Glenn Frey, the guitarist and co-lead vocalist for the Eagles. It was released in 1992 by MCA. Though considered an improvement from Frey's previous album by most critics, it went largely unnoticed by the public. It was a commercial disappointment, failing to chart in the US, and none of its three singles reached the Top 40, a first for Frey. "Part of Me, Part of You" was earlier released as part of the Thelma and Louise soundtrack and peaked at #55.

It was his last full album of original material before his death in 2016, as his next album, After Hours (2012), would consist primarily of covers.

Critical reception
Reviewing for AllMusic, critic William Ruhlmann wrote of the album "With his solo career fading, Glenn Frey got serious on his fourth album, but many of the album's sentiments sounded strange coming from him." In a review for The Rolling Stone Album Guide (1992), Mark Coleman gave the album three out of five stars and wrote that "Frey seemed determined to make a statement. "Love in the 21st Century" was a catchy but deposable rocker in the vein of his Beverly Hills Cop soundtrack hit "The Heat Is On", but both "I've Got Mine" and "He Took Advantage (Blues for Ronald Reagan)" found him stumbling around in the same rich-rock-star-as-self-righteous-angry-liberal footsteps as Henley."

Track listing
All songs by Glenn Frey and Jack Tempchin, except where noted.

Personnel 

 Glenn Frey – lead vocals, backing vocals, all instruments and programming (1-14), acoustic guitar (15), arrangements 
 Jay Oliver – all instruments and programming (1-14), additional keyboards (15)
 Robbie Kilgore – additional keyboards (1-14)
 Mike Harlow – additional programming (1-14)
 Scott Thurston – acoustic piano (15)
 Benmont Tench – organ (15)
 Mark Goldenberg – guitar (15)
 Jerry Scheff – bass (15)
 Kenny Aronoff – drums (15)
 Lenny Castro – percussion (1-14)
 Al Garth – saxophone solo (7)
 Chris Mostert – saxophone solo (8)
 The Heart Attack Horns:
 Bill Bergman – tenor saxophone
 Greg Smith – baritone saxophone, arrangements
 John Berry, Jr. – trumpet
 Roy Wiegand – trumpet
 Rosemary Butler – backing vocals
 Valerie Carter – backing vocals
 Bobby Martin – backing vocals

Production
 Producers – Glenn Frey and Elliot Scheiner (All tracks); Don Was (Track 15).
 Engineers – Mike Harlow and Elliot Scheiner
 Second Engineers – Tim Nitz and Chris Rich
 Recorded at Bill Schnee Studios, Cherokee Studios and Soundcastle (Hollywood, CA); Mad Dog Ranch (Crawford, CO).
 Mixed by Elliot Scheiner at Mad Dog Ranch.
 Digitally Edited and Mastered by Ted Jensen at Sterling Sound (New York, NY).
 Production Coordination – Ivy Skoff
 Art Direction – Vartan Kurjian
 Design – Sarajo Frieden
 Cover Art – Carl Johansen
 Photography – Caroline Greyshock

Charts

Singles

References 

Glenn Frey albums
1992 albums
Albums produced by Don Was
MCA Records albums